The University Clinical Aptitude Test (UCAT) is an admissions test used in the selection process by a consortium of universities in the United Kingdom, Australia and New Zealand for their medical and dental degree programmes. Launched in 2006 as the UK Clinical Aptitude Test (UKCAT), it was renamed in 2019 following the launch of the test in Australia and New Zealand.

It is one of two main admissions tests used in the UK for medical, dental and other health-related courses, the other being the BioMedical Admissions Test (BMAT).  Since 2020 the annual number of test takers has risen to over 30,000 candidates each year.

Format

The UCAT is designed to be a test of aptitude and attitude, not academic achievement. The latter is already demonstrated by A-Levels, Scottish Highers or undergraduate degrees.  It attempts to assess a certain range of mental abilities and behavioural attributes identified as useful. These mental abilities include critical thinking as well as logical reasoning and inference.

The UCAT consists of five subtests: four cognitive tests, and one testing your professional demeanour. Each test has a time allocation as below:

 Verbal Reasoning – assesses candidates' ability to think logically about written information and arrive at a reasoned conclusion. The candidate is given 21 minutes, with 11 passages to read and 44 questions to answer in that time.
 Decision Making – assesses ability to apply logic to reach a decision or conclusion, evaluate arguments and analyse statistical information. The candidate is allocated 31 minutes to answer 29 items associated with text, charts, tables, graphs or diagrams.
 Quantitative Reasoning – assesses candidates' ability to solve numerical problems. The candidate is given 25 minutes to answer 36 questions associated with either tables, charts, graphs etc. as information.
 Abstract Reasoning – assesses candidates' ability to infer relationships from information by convergent and divergent thinking. The candidate is allocated 12 minutes to answer 50 questions associated with sets of shapes.

The situational judgement test is a different type of test from the tests above:

 Situational Judgement – measures candidates' responses in situations and their grasp of medical ethics and capacity to understand real world situations. This section of the test is 26 minutes long, with 66 questions associated with 22 scenarios.

The test is a computer-based, online test taken at a Pearson Vue centre near the candidate. Candidates are not allowed to bring external materials in to the exam. A basic calculator is provided on the screen, along with a white board and a marker pen for taking notes. The equipment and conditions vary slightly between different test centers.

Including 1 minute to read instructions before each subtest, the test lasts a maximum of 2 hours (or 2.5 hours for the UCATSEN version of the test).  Each of the UCAT subtests is in a multiple-choice format and is separately timed. There is also 2 minutes of warm-up time (to read general instructions on the whole exam) at the start.

The test must be sat in the summer of 2022 by candidates who want to apply to member universities for entry in 2023 (or deferred entry in 2024).

Content and preparation

There is no curriculum content, as the test is designed to probe innate skills. These include basic arithmetic, reading and writing ability, along with character, and personal and social attitudes.

Past papers are not available. There are however question banks and fully timed practice tests on the UCAT website. All candidates are urged to read this attentively. The UCAT Consortium recommend that candidates prepare for the test, and provide extensive free materials on their site to assist.

Scoring and Results

Each of the first four subsections (Verbal Reasoning, Decision Making, Quantitative Reasoning and Abstract Reasoning) are each scored in a range of 300 - 900. The Situational Judgement Test is scored with bands 1–4.

Unlike the BMAT, UCAT test takers are informed of their UCAT result immediately after sitting their test, and well in advance of the UCAS deadline, allowing them to consider this when selecting their UCAS choices.  Universities use UCAT results in different ways during their admissions processes, but should all provide information on their websites regarding how they use the UCAT in selection.  

For some universities the UCAT score is a significant factor in their consideration of applications. For others it may be a less significant factor or only used in marginal situations.  Most universities consider total score (i.e. the score after each of the cognitive subtest scores have been added together).  However some do look at individual subtest scores and may even have a cut-off score for a particular subtest.

Widening Participation

The UCAT Consortium offers a bursary scheme to cover the full test fee to UK and EU candidates in financial need who meet a set eligibility criteria.

Usefulness and controversies

The UCAT Consortium specifies, "Every university uses the UCAT result as part of a well-rounded admissions policy in which several other factors also carry considerable weight." UCAT has been shown to have some independent predictive validity of performance at medical school, but considerably less than A-levels.

There is some evidence from Australia that women and people from more rural areas or of lower socio‐economic status perform less well on the UCAT, and this appears to be to a greater extent than with the UMAT exam that it replaced in Australia.

A summary of relevant published work since 2009 is available on the Published Research  page of the UCAT website.

Participating universities
As of 2022, the UCAT is a compulsory entry requirement for medical and / or dental courses at the following universities:

Australia 
 University of Adelaide
 Central Queensland University
 Charles Sturt University
 Curtin University
 Flinders University
 Griffith University
 Monash University
 University of Newcastle / University of New England
 University of New South Wales
 University of Queensland
 University of Tasmania
 University of Western Australia
 Western Sydney University

New Zealand 
 University of Auckland
 University of Otago

United Kingdom  
 University of Aberdeen
 Anglia Ruskin University
 Aston University
 University of Birmingham
 University of Bristol
 Brunel University London
 Cardiff University
 University of Chester
 University of Dundee
 University of East Anglia
 Edge Hill University
 University of Edinburgh
 University of Exeter
 University of Glasgow
 Hull York Medical School
 Keele University
 Kent and Medway Medical School
 King's College London
 University of Leicester
 University of Liverpool
 University of Manchester
 Newcastle University
 University of Nottingham
 University of Lincoln
 Plymouth University
 Queen Mary University of London
 Queen's University Belfast
 University of Sheffield
 University of Southampton
 University of St Andrews
 St George's, University of London
 University of Sunderland
 University of Surrey
 University of Warwick (Graduate Entry)
 University of Worcester

See also
BMAT
GAMSAT

References

External links

Education in the United Kingdom
Medical education in the United Kingdom
Standardized tests in healthcare education